Guy Molloy (born 4 November 1965) is an Australian basketball coach, who is currently the head coach of the Southland Sharks in the New Zealand National Basketball League (NZNBL).

Coaching career

WNBL
Molloy began his coaching career as head coach of the Canberra Capitals for the 1989 WNBL season. Between 1993 to 1996 he served as head coach of the Perth Breakers. The Breakers reached the finals in all four of Molloy's seasons, including reaching the 1993 Grand Final. In 1995, Molloy was named the WNBL Coach of the Year.

In 2013, Molloy returned to the WNBL, as head coach of the newly branded Melbourne Boomers. In his first season back, after leading the Boomers to the semi-finals, he was named the WNBL Coach of the Year for the second time. He parted ways with the Boomers at the end of the 2021–22 WNBL season after leading them to the championship.

NBL
Molloy was appointed head coach of the Cairns Taipans of the NBL in 2001. He left the Taipans in 2005 after four seasons. Between 2006 and 2009, he served as an assistant coach with the South Dragons. He was a member of their championship-winning team in 2009.

NZNBL
In November 2021, Molloy was appointed head coach of the Wellington Saints for the 2022 New Zealand NBL season. As defending champions and the most successful club in NZNBL history with 12 titles, the Saints went 3–7 over the first ten games to be in danger of missing the top six finals for the first time since 2007. As a result, Molloy was sacked on 21 June 2022.

In December 2022, Molloy was appointed head coach of the Southland Sharks for the 2023 New Zealand NBL season.

National teams
Molloy served as an assistant coach with the Australian Opals from 1989–1994. During this time, he was on board during both the 1990 and 1994 FIBA World Championship tournaments.

In 2009, Molloy was appointed head coach of the Australia U-17 men's team, leading into the inaugural FIBA Under-17 World Championship in 2010. Following Australia's sixth place finish in 2010, Molloy was reappointed leading into the next tournament in 2012. Here, Molloy coached a Dante Exum-led team to a silver medal.
 
In 2017, Molloy was appointed as assistant coach to Kennedy Kereama with the New Zealand Tall Ferns, leading into the 2017 FIBA Asia Women's Cup. In 2018, he was promoted to head coach of the Tall Ferns. He led the Tall Ferns to the bronze medal at the 2018 Commonwealth Games.

Coaching record

WNBL 

|-
| align="left"|Canberra
| align="left"|1989
| 23 
| 8
| 15
|
| align="center" |9th of 12
|–
|–
|–
|–
| 
|-
| align="left"|Perth
| align="left"|1993
| 18 
| 12
| 6
|
| align="center" |3rd of 10
|3
|2
|1 
|
| align="center" |Lost Grand Final
|-
| align="left"|Perth
| align="left"|1994
| 18
| 12
| 6
|
| align="center" |4th of 10
|2
|1
|1 
|
| align="center" |Lost Preliminary Final
|-  
| align="left"|Perth
| align="left"|1995
| 18
| 12
| 6
|
| align="center" |4th of 10
|1
|0
|1
|
| align="center" |Lost Semi Finals
|-
| align="left"|Perth
| align="left"|1996
| 18 
| 11
| 7
|
| align="center" |4th of 10
|3
|2
|1
|
| align="center" |Lost Preliminary Final
|-
| align="left" |Melbourne
| align="left" |2013–14
| 24 
| 14
| 10
|
| align="center" |4th of 9
|1
|0
|1
|
| align="center" |Lost Semi Finals
|-
| align="left" |Melbourne
| align="left" |2014–15
| 22
| 11
| 11
|
| align="center" |6th of 8
|–
|–
|–
|–
| 
|-  
| align="left" |Melbourne
| align="left" |2015–16
| 24 
| 8
| 16
|
| align="center" |8th of 9
|–
|–
|–
|–
| 
|-
| align="left" |Melbourne
| align="left" |2016–17
| 24 
| 5
| 19
|
| align="center" |7th of 8 
|–
|–
|–
|–
| 
|-
| align="left" |Melbourne
| align="left" |2017–18
| 21 
| 12
| 9
|
| align="center" |4th of 8
|5
|3
|2 
|
| align="center" |Lost Grand Final
|-
| align="left" |Melbourne
| align="left" |2018–19
| 21
| 15
| 6
|
| align="center" |2nd of 8
|2
|0 
|2 
|
| align="center" |Lost Semi Finals
|-
| align="left" |Melbourne
| align="left" |2019–20
| 21
| 15
| 6
|
| align="center" |3rd of 8
|3
|1
|2 
|
| align="center" |Lost Semi Finals
|-
| align="left" |Melbourne
| align="left" |2020
| 13
| 9
| 4
|
| align="center" |4th of 8
|2
|1
|1 
|
| align="center" |Lost Preliminary Final
|-class="sortbottom"
| align="left" |Career
| ||265||144||121|||| ||22||10||12||

References

External links 
 "Taipans re-sign Molloy" at nbl.com.au

1965 births
Living people
Australian women's basketball coaches
Australian men's basketball coaches
Canberra Capitals coaches
Perth Lynx coaches
Cairns Taipans coaches
Melbourne Boomers coaches
University of Canberra alumni